Husn Camp or Al-Husn Camp, known locally as Martyr Azmi el-Mufti camp, is a Palestinian refugee camp in Jordan. It was established in 1968 as an emergency camp to house 12,500 refugees who were displaced from the West Bank and the Gaza Strip during the 1967 Six-Day War. As of 2005, it housed 50,573 refugees. The camp has a women's centre, four schools in two buildings, a health centre, a food distribution centre, and a rehabilitation centre.

Housing
With the influx of more refugees, 2,990 prefabricated structures were constructed between 1969 and 1971 by the United Nations Relief and Works Agency for Palestine Refugees in the Near East (UNRWA). Many of the refugees were shifted to these prefab housing complex.

Demographics
The initial refugee population, centered at a temporary facility, was 12,500, while there are now over 22,000 refugees registered at the camp. The demographic statistics indicate that people in the age group of 25-45 constitute about 30 percent, while children in the age range of 0–5 years are about 12 percent, and senior citizens above 60 years of age constitute about 10 percent.

Support facilities
They include health, education, relief, and social services at nine locations operated by 167 staff members. The camp also has a women's programme centre, which generates income for women.

The Husn refuge camp has one health center. It is staffed by a doctor, one or more nurses, and a midwife. The four schools, which are housed in two buildings, are supported under the education programme of UNESCO. The Social safety net programme of UNRWA also provides distribution of cash subsidies and also food to refugees apart from providing vocational training centres or education science facilities to selected students in the hardship category.

References

Palestinian refugee camps in Jordan
1968 establishments in Jordan
Populated places in Irbid Governorate